The Ukishima Solar Power Plant is a 7 MW solar photovoltaic power station located on the waterfront in Kawasaki. It is the first solar plant built by Tepco, and was completed on August 10, 2011. In the first year of operation, it produced 9,453 MWh, a capacity factor of 0.15, which was about 30% greater than anticipated. An unusual feature of the plant is that the panels are mounted at a fixed angle of 10°, instead of the 30°, which would normally be considered optimal for this latitude.

See also

Komekurayama Solar Power Plant
Ogishima Solar Power Plant
Solar power in Japan

References 

Photovoltaic power stations in Japan
Buildings and structures in Kawasaki, Kanagawa
Tokyo Electric Power Company
Energy infrastructure completed in 2011
2011 establishments in Japan